Beverly Semmes (born 1958) is an American artist based in New York City who works in sculpture, textile, video, photography, performance, and large-scale installation. She studied at the Boston Museum School, Tufts University, and at the Yale University School of Art. During her graduate studies she experimented with heavy wire sculptures and with artificial objects rendered as natural ones, such as trees made of steel with painted-on leaves, which she ultimately placed in natural settings.  Semmes is now best known for her large-scale sculpture and installations, which often explore the relationship between craft and fine art while simultaneously dealing with issues related to feminism, gender roles and womanhood. She explores this in many different ways, notably with her textile work, as textiles are traditionally associated with women and women's work. Her oversized dresses are dysfunctional in scale and composition, emphasizing the absence of the body. Semmes has stated that these pieces have a theatrical, performative quality and that she uses clothing as a means to explore its power and influence on the internal and external. Her ceramic works, often juxtaposed with her fabric installations, tend to be roughly shaped vessels in bright fluorescent shades, while her crystal works defy our expectations of the medium and serve as a metaphor for the female body.

Semmes has had solo exhibitions at MoMA PS1, New York; Museum of Contemporary Art, Chicago; Camden Arts Centre, London; Institute of Contemporary Art, Philadelphia; Fabric Workshop and Museum, Philadelphia; and, the Wexner Center for the Arts, Columbus. She has participated in group exhibitions at domestic and international institutions such as the Hirshhorn Museum and Sculpture Garden; Carnegie Museum of Art; John Michael Kohler Arts Center; Aldrich Contemporary Art Museum; Institute of Contemporary Art, Boston; Museum of Contemporary Art, Miami; Institute of Contemporary Art, Philadelphia; Denver Art Museum; and, the Kunsthalle Wien, Vienna. Semmes' work is in the public collections of the Hirshhorn Museum and Sculpture Garden; Whitney Museum of American Art; Hammer Museum; Museum of Contemporary Art, Los Angeles; Nasher Sculpture Center, Dallas; and, Denver Art Museum amongst others.

The artist is represented by Susan Inglett Gallery, NYC.

Feminist Responsibility Project (FRP) 
Semmes began work on her series Feminist Responsibility Project (FRP) in the early 2000s. After receiving a cache of gentleman's magazines from a neighbor, the artist has spent the last two decades censoring pages from Penthouse and Hustler magazine with ink and paint. She partially covers the models' bodies as they engaged in titillating positions and acts, turning them into boldly-colored, abstract shapes and leaving their extremities, faces, and limbs uncovered. Writing on the FRP series, critic Martha Schwendener stated, “What she leaves blank, amid these colorful, blobby abstractions, are grasping hands, supplicating eyes, or sharp stiletto heels we associate with pornographic images (and performances).” The censoring of the images serves as an effort to protect the subject and the viewer from the imagery of porn, highlighting American society's conflicted relationship to pornography and sexual censorship.

In conversation with curator Ian Berry, Semmes stated that her role as a censor of the FRP images was complicated and made her feel"Shocked, amused, embarrassed. As I took out [body] parts that were more problematic for me, I could outlines the parts that had another appeal. I could bring it to a different place that made me more comfortable without the aspects that I found more disturbing."In 2014, the Tang Museum presented the exhibition Opener 27 Beverly Semmes: FRP, which subsequently traveled to the Weatherspoon Art Museum and the Faulconer Gallery at Grinnell College.

Witch Hunt 
Starting October 10, 2021, the Hammer Museum in Los Angeles, California, will house an exhibition titled Witch Hunt, featuring sixteen women artists from thirteen countries. Semmes' work Helmet (2018) will be featured alongside many other works that strive to encourage dialogue about contemporary feminist issues.

Exhibitions And Collections 

 · Nasher Sculpture Center, Dallas, Texas
 Museum of Contemporary Art, Los Angeles, California
 Museum of Contemporary Art, North Miami, Florida
 Hirshhorn Museum and Sculpture Garden, Washington, D.C (part of the Smithsonian Institution)
 Denver Art Museum, Denver, Colorado
 Whitney Museum of American Art, New York City, New York

References

External links 
 https://web.archive.org/web/20131103013359/http://www.beverlysemmesstudio.com/images.html
 https://tang.skidmore.edu/collection/explore/7-beverly-semmes%20with%20UploadWizard

American women sculptors
Living people
American multimedia artists
Artists from New York City
American installation artists
American women installation artists
Sculptors from New York (state)
21st-century American women artists
1958 births